Abdul Hameed Chapra was a Pakistani journalist and activist who was a former president of Karachi Press Club. He died on 23 December 2020 in Karachi.

He always had raised and defended the rights of the workers and hawkers of the newspapers, and struggled for the freedom of the press and for the rights of working journalists.

Early life and career
Chapra was elected five times president of the Karachi Press Club from 1980 to 1985. He was also president of the Pakistan Federal Union of Journalists (PFUJ) and fought against Military regimes for the freedom of the media and democracy in Pakistan.

He was jailed during the 1978 movement for freedom of the press during General Zia ul Haq’s regime.

Death
Abdul Hameed Chapra died on 22 December 2020 after a brief illness. Among his survivors are his wife, three daughters and a son.

See also

 List of Pakistani journalists

References

External links
 Senior journalists remembered
 In solidarity: TV reporter in critical condition after Shooting

20th-century births
2020 deaths
Pakistani male journalists
Year of birth missing